Bluff is an unincorporated community in Fayette County, Alabama, United States.

History
The community is named after a nearby ridge. A post office operated under the name Bluff from 1897 to 1905.

References

Unincorporated communities in Fayette County, Alabama
Unincorporated communities in Alabama